This is a list of rivers in Brunei.

Longest river by district

Rivers by district

Belait 

 Belait
Geriting
Gana
Lumut
Kang
Liang Kecil
Kayu Ara
Anduki
Bera
Seria
Mendaram
Damit
Bedas
Premat
Baran

Tutong 

Tutong
Kelakas
Danau
Birau
Sembatang
Kalamang
Kelugus
Pentyatang
Pepakan
Tempikku
Telamba

Temburong 

Pandaruan
Temburong
Belayang
Kibi
Labu
Luagan
Lamaling Besar
Lakiun
Kutop

Brunei-Muara 

Brunei
Berakas
Limbang
Butir
Menunggul
Kedayan
Damuan
Teritip
Mentiri
Salar
Pagalayan
Mangsalut
Kianggeh

References

External links 
 
 - Topographic US Army map of Western Brunei.
 - Topographic US Army map of Eastern Brunei.

Brunei
Rivers